The  IIFA Award for Best Choreography is a technical award chosen ahead of the International Indian Film Academy Awards ceremonies. Saroj Khan received the first choreography award in 2000. Farah Khan (6 wins) is the most awarded choreographer followed by duo Bosco–Caesar (3 wins) and Saroj Khan / Vaibhavi Merchant / Remo D'Souza (2 wins each).

The winners are listed below:-

See also 
 IIFA Awards
 Bollywood
 Cinema of India

References

External links
 2008 winners 

International Indian Film Academy Awards
Indian choreography awards